A Little Juicy is an album by saxophonist Billy Mitchell, released in 1964 on Smash Records.

Track listing
All compositions by Thad Jones except where noted
 "Little Juicy" – 7:48	
 "Stella by Starlight" (Victor Young, Ned Washington) – 6:43
 "Bossa Nova Ova" – 3:20
 "Brother Peabody" – 5:54
 "Oliver Jr." (Billy Mitchell, Kenny Burrell) – 6:10	
 "Kids are Pretty People" – 5:12

Personnel 
Billy Mitchell – tenor saxophone
Thad Jones – trumpet
Kenny Burrell – guitar
Richard Wyands – piano
Herman Wright – bass
Oliver Jackson Jr. – drums

References

1964 albums
Billy Mitchell (jazz musician) albums
Smash Records albums